The Jean Hersholt Humanitarian Award is awarded periodically by the Academy of Motion Picture Arts and Sciences (AMPAS) at the Governors Awards ceremonies for an individual's "outstanding contributions to humanitarian causes". Prior to 2009 and in 2021, this award was presented during the main Oscars ceremony. The award category was instituted in 1956 and first awarded at the 29th Academy Awards, in March 1957. Unlike the Academy Award of Merit, the awards are restricted with the nomination and voting limited to industry professionals for this that are members of the Board of Governors of AMPAS.

History

The award is named after Danish American screen actor and humanitarian Jean Hersholt (1886–1956), who served as president of the Motion Picture Relief Fund for 18 years. He also served as president of AMPAS from 1945 to 1949. Winners of the Jean Hersholt Humanitarian Award are presented with an Academy Award Oscar statuette. As of the 92nd Academy Awards, there have been 39 awards presented, two of which were posthumous.

List of recipients

See also
 List of posthumous Academy Award winners and nominees

Notes

References

Hersholt Humanitarian Award
Humanitarian and service awards
Awards established in 1956
1956 establishments in the United States